Lovers & Strangers, also translated as Only Love Strangers is a 1999 album by Beijing-based C-pop singer Faye Wong. It contains 10 tracks in Mandarin with bonus Cantonese versions of two of the songs. The title is from a line of the refrain in track 4 (... 我只爱陌生人, I only love strangers...).

The album sold more than 800,000 copies and reached number one in the album charts of Hong Kong, China, Taiwan, Singapore, and Malaysia.

After the release of Lovers & Strangers, Guinness World Records declared Faye Wong the best-selling female Cantopop artist of all time.

Track listing

Tracks 11 and 12 are Cantonese versions of tracks 5 and 6 respectively. Only track 12 has a different musical arrangement.

The title of track 5 is the Chinese name of Gabriel Garcia Marquez' novel One Hundred Years of Solitude.

Use in other media

Track 10, the rock song "Spectacular", featured in a Pepsi commercial. A VCD showing the filming of the commercial was released with some versions of the album.

The title track, "Only Love Strangers", was featured in the Sylvester Stallone film Get Carter.

Track 5 was used by Taiwan's STAR Chinese Channel as the ending theme song of the Chinese television series The Taiping Heavenly Kingdom. The original ending theme song was sung by Mao Amin.

References

External links
, Hong Kong version

1999 albums
Faye Wong albums
Mandopop albums
EMI Records albums